Nisu may refer to:
 Pulla, Finnish pastry
 Nisu language, ethnic sub group in Yunnan China